Burkes Pass is a mountain pass and at its base, a small town on State Highway 8 at the entrance to the Mackenzie Country in South Canterbury, New Zealand. It is named after Michael John Burke (1812 Co. Galway-1869 Melbourne) a graduate of Dublin University, who drove a team of bullocks through the passageway which leads up into the Mackenzie Country in 1855. This was an alternative route to the Mackenzie Pass, which the notorious alleged sheep stealer, James Mckenzie, had used to take his sheep into the Otago goldfields. A memorial to Burke stands close to the pass's saddle.

Burke may not have been the first European to cross the Pass called after him. G Dunnage camped in the vicinity in 1855 before the geographical features were named.
(Info Source: Timaru Museum Database)

A dray track was cut through Burkes Pass in 1857-58. Settlers and bullock teams soon found The Long Cutting was the easier of the two passageways to negotiate, becoming the main thoroughfare for travellers in to the Mackenzie, a vast land known by Maori for its plentiful supply of wekas on the plains and eels in the streams and lakes. With travel slow and arduous, the need for a resting place for weary travellers soon became evident.

A  site, on the west side of the top of The Long Cutting, was set aside in 1859 to establish a central depot for coal, wood, and food supplies. It was a bleak, exposed site, between Sterickers Mound, near Sawdon Creek, and the foot of the spur from Mount Burgess. James Noonan<South Canterbury- A Record of Settlement, O.A Gillespie, 1958 p 280> ignored the official township site building the first hotel in 1861 at Cabbage Tree Creek in the valley behind where the remains of the hotel built in 1869 are today.

A town, first known as Cabbage Tree Creek, then Clulee, and finally Burkes Pass, sprang up around the hotel. For more than half a century a colourful cavalcade passed through the town, Burkes Pass becoming the social, business, and sporting centre for the Mackenzie Country pioneers. Its heyday was 1890 to 1910 when there was a population of 143 and a three-teacher school.

However, the promised railway, which was to cement Burkes Pass’s future as the capital of the Mackenzie, never arrived. It stopped at Fairlie in 1884, displacing Burkes Pass as the business centre. The final blow was in 1891, when the Mount Cook Road Board, in a 4–3 vote, decided to relocate to Fairlie.

The Burkes Pass Scenic Reserve, administered by the Department of Conservation, is a former stock droving reserve one kilometre to the west of the pass. The ecological values are threatened by introduced rabbits, lupin, broom and wilding conifers. Burkes Pass is home to the critically endangered Canterbury knobbled weevil which lives on speargrass. It has only been found in a  site at Burkes Pass.

Notable people

References

External links
The Burkes Pass Heritage Trust

Mackenzie District
Mountain passes of New Zealand
Transport in Canterbury, New Zealand
Landforms of Canterbury, New Zealand